Catherine Gage (18 May 1815 – 16 February 1892) was an Irish botanist, botanical and ornithological illustrator.

Life

Catherine Gage was born in County Down on 18 May 1815, the daughter of Rev. Robert Gage and Catherine Boyd. Gage lived her entire life in the family home, Manor House on Rathlin Island. Gage died 16 February 1892 and was buried on Rathlin Island.

Illustration work
Gage seems to have devoted a large portion of her life to illustrating a book by her brother Robert Gage on the birds of Rathlin Island that was never published. The book was styled on that of John James Audubon's The Birds of America. During the course of this work she produced over five hundred watercolours of birds.  She also illustrated local plants, creating a list for the Botanical Society of Edinburgh, the abstract for which was published in the 1850 Annals and Magazine of Natural History. She also worked with her sister, Barbara Gage (1817–1859), illustrating the local flora as well as the fauna.

When the folio of bird illustrations was auctioned in 2010, they were sold for €13,500.

References

19th-century Irish botanists
Botanical illustrators
Women botanists
1815 births
1892 deaths
People from County Down
Bird artists
19th-century Irish painters
19th-century British women scientists
Irish women botanists